John Raymond Dyer Jr. (born 14 December 1940) is a former Australian rules footballer who played with Richmond in the Victorian Football League (VFL).

Family
The son of Richmond great Jack Dyer (1913-2003), and Sybil Margaret Dyer (1915-1968), née McCasker. John Raymond Dyer was born on 14 December 1940.

He married Lorraine Helen Faulkener, in Richmond, on 26 June 1965.

Football

Richmond (VFL)
Originally from East St Kilda CYMS,  

In 1959 he played 8 games for the Richmond Under-19 (Thirds), and from 1960 to 1961 played in 27 games for the Richmond Seconds. In 1960, he was selected for the VFL Reserves representative team.

He made three appearances for Richmond in the 1960 VFL season.

Prahran (VFA)
Having transferred to Prahran, he played in 16 senior games over two seasons (1962-1963).

Notes

References
 Hogan P, The Tigers of Old: A Complete History of Every Player to Represent the Richmond Football Club between 1908 and 1996, Richmond FC, (Melbourne), 1996.

External links
 
 
 Jack Dyer (Jnr), at The VFA Project.

1940 births
Living people
Australian rules footballers from Victoria (Australia)
Richmond Football Club players
Prahran Football Club players